UFO is a video game for MS-DOS compatible operating systems published in 1989 by Sublogic.

Gameplay
UFO is a game in which the player is in command of an alien flying saucer.

Reception
Daniel Hockman reviewed the game for Computer Gaming World, and stated that "the game is unique. There is nothing else like it on the market. If you want something different, can live with polygon cities, and are willing to tackle some truly difficult flight demands you might want to give UFO a try."

Reviews
ASM (Aktueller Software Markt) - Nov, 1989
The Games Machine - Jan, 1990
Computer Gaming World - Nov, 1992

References

1989 video games
Alien invasions in video games
DOS games
DOS-only games
Flight simulation video games
UFO-related media
Video games developed in the United States